The State of Florida v. Michael Boatwright, Trayvon Newsome, and Dedrick Williams was an American criminal case in Florida's 17th Judicial Circuit in which the three were accused of robbing and murdering Jahseh Onfroy, the rapper and singer who performed as XXXTentacion. They were convicted and all face life in prison without the possibility of parole.

On June 18, 2018, after leaving RIVA motorsports in Deerfield Beach, Florida in his car, Onfroy was stopped by two masked men who robbed him at gun point. He was then shot three times and died from his wounds. Michael Boatwright and Trayvon Newsome were the gunmen, Boatwright was the shooter, and Dedrick Williams was the main orchestrator. The trial began on February 7, 2023. Both the prosecution and defense rested their cases on March 3, 2023. Closing arguments occurred on March 7 and 8, and on March 20, the jury found all defendants guilty.

Background

Arrests and charges 
Two days after the murder of Jahseh Onfroy,  XXXTentacion, 22-year-old Dedrick Devonshay Williams was arrested on June 20, 2018, in connection with the killing. He was charged with dangerous and depraved first-degree murder, robbery with a firearm, and operating a vehicle without a valid driver's license. Three arrests followed in the coming months; 22-year-old Robert Allen, 22-year old Michael Boatwright, and 20-year old Trayvon Newsome were arrested and charged with premeditated first-degree murder and robbery with a firearm. All were later indicted by a grand jury on premeditated murder.

Robert Allen's guilty plea 
On August 12, 2022, defendant Robert Allen, who had been charged with premeditated first-degree murder and robbery with a firearm, pleaded guilty to the latter and the lesser conviction of second-degree murder as a plea deal to testify against Boatwright, Newsome, and Williams at trial. He faces up to life in prison.

Trial 
The trial of Michael Boatwright, Trayvon Newsome, and Dedrick Williams began on February 7, 2023, after ten days of jury selection, nearly five years after the death of Jahseh Onfroy.

Prosecution's opening statement 
Lead prosecutor Pascale Achille gave the opening statement for the state. She gave an overview of the state's case, that the three defendants, along with Allen, tracked and targeted Onfroy and that surveillance video, among other evidence, will prove it. She said that the defendants trapped Onfroy in his black BMW with their rented Dodge Journey, and stole Onfroy's Louis Vuitton bag containing $50,000 in cash. She stated that Boatwright then murdered Onfroy without provocation, and that the defendants later boasted on social media about the cash which they robbed from Onfroy.

Defenses' opening statements 
Michael Boatwright's attorney, Joseph Kimok stated in his opening statement that Michael Boatwright was innocent and had been falsely accused of murdering Onfroy. He alleged that Broward County authorities rushed the investigation, and that Boatwright took some "very stupid" photos with the stolen money, but that he was not the murderer. He claimed that the fact that Boatwright searched "accessory to murder" proves that he is innocent. Newsome's attorney, George Reres similarly claimed that his client was not there, and Williams's attorney, Mauricio Padilla alleged that authorities did not investigate the possibility that rapper Drake, whom Onfroy had feuded with, was involved, and similarly to Kimok, accused authorities of rushing the investigation.

Testimonies

Leonard Kerr 
Onfroy's step-uncle, Leonard Kerr, was with Onfroy in his vehicle when he was confronted by the suspects. He testified the first day of the trial. He testified that he believed the only way he could live was if he ran out of the car, which he did.

Robert Allen 
February 8, 2023, the second day of the trial, featured further testimony from Kerr and further display of surveillance footage. The most prominent portion was accomplice Robert Allen's testimony against the other three defendants. 

Robert Allen, who had pleaded guilty to the second-degree murder of Onfroy (with the premeditated first-degree murder charge dropped) and armed robbery in exchange for testimony against the other three defendants, testified against the three on day two of the trial on February 8, 2023. 

Allen stated that he had been closest with Dedrick Williams out of the three defendants, and had been friends with him for about five years and hung out almost every day. Allen stated that Trayvon Newsome had been living with him for about two or three weeks at the time of the murder. He stated that he had known Michael Boatwright for about two years at the time of the murder. He said that he also had seen Boatwright almost every day.

Allen corroborated the prosecution's account of the murder. He elaborated about the planning of the killing, describing how Williams was the main planner. He stated under oath that he, Boatwright, Newsome, and Williams tracked Onfroy once they spotted him. Williams noticed Onfroy's car and intentionally drove into RIVA Motorsports, and saw Onfroy get out of his car and walk into the store. Boatwright and Newsome then told Allen and Williams that they should go into RIVA Motorsports to confirm that it was actually Onfroy. They then bought masks in the store for the robbery/murder. He and Williams then came back to the car and informed Boatwright and Newsome that it was Onfroy in the store. Allen stated that he initially told the others that the robbery was not a good idea because he and Williams had already been on surveillance at RIVA Motorsports. He said that Boatwright and Newsome then became reluctant to go forward with the crime. Williams asked the two if they were scared, and Boatwright replied, "Alright, we're gonna get him." Allen stated that Boatwright and Newsome were chosen to be the gunmen due to the fact that he and Williams were already on surveillance footage. The four parked lying in wait for Onfroy for about 10 minutes, and the robbery ensued followed by Boatwright murdering Onfroy by shooting him.

Allen confirmed the prosecution's account that it was the plan to rob and murder Onfroy once they had trapped him with the Dodge Journey, and that Boatwright and Newsome stole Onfroy's gold chain and Louis Vuitton bag containing $50,000. He stated that originally, since Allen perceivably had the smallest role in the robbery and murder, that Newsome and Williams said that Allen should not have gotten any of the stolen money, but Boatwright insisted that Allen get some of the money since he was there with them. They agreed that of the $50,000, Boatwright, Newsome, and Williams would get $15,000 each and Allen would get $5,000. He also contradicted Boatwright's attorney's defense; Boatwright's attorney claimed in his opening statement that the fact that Boatwright had searched "accessory to murder" proved that Boatwright did not commit the murder, and was just associated with the men afterwards. Allen stated that the actual reason was because Allen said he was afraid he would be arrested for murder following the killing, and Boatwright misinformed him that at most Allen could be charged with accessory after-the-fact to murder, and searched for it during his conversation with Allen to show him the legal definition. 

Allen, Boatwright, and Newsome learned of Onfroy's confirmed death while they were in the car, attempting to go to a car wash. Allen stated that he and Newsome were silent and that Boatwright turned the music up afterwards. Boatwright soon accidentally crashed the Dodge Journey, and they ran away from the scene. All four later met up at Boatwright's house, with Boatwright telling Allen he needed to go back to the scene to get the car. Allen refused, saying that he wanted nothing to do with the murder vehicle. Newsome eventually complied with Boatwright and went back to the scene and retrieved the car. Williams learned of Onfroy's confirmed death while at Boatwright's and said to Allen, "Damn, he's really dead," while Allen remained silent.

February 10, 2023, the fourth day of the trial, mainly consisted of cross-examination of Allen by defense attorneys. Boatwright's attorney additionally attempted to impeach Allen as a state witness, but was denied by the trial judge.

When Allen was asked by Williams's attorney if he was testifying against the other three defendants to "save [his] own skin" to get a lighter sentence or if he genuinely had remorse, Allen responded, "Well, I definitely would like to get a lighter sentence, yes, but I definitely have remorse ... I mean, I sit and look at the stand and see people crying, and I'm trying to do my best to get [Onfroy's] family and friends and his fans justice." He stated that his time in jail has given him much time to reflect on the situation.

Scott Barbieux 
On February 14, 2023, Scott Barbieux, a fan of XXXTentacion who witnessed the murder, gave testimony describing his perspective of the robbery and murder. He corroborated the prosecution's order of events. Barbieux's testimony gained attention on social media due to the perceived strange mannerisms he displayed, commonly interrupting the attorneys. Barbieux's testimony was notable because he took a picture of Onfroy's dead body after the murder, and when asked why he did so by the prosecution, stated, "Because I was a big fan of his and I wanted to have a photo to remember that forever," which came off as bizarre to XXXTentacion fans on social media.

Tenell Carter 
On February 15, 2023, Dedrick Williams's former girlfriend, Tenell Carter testified against Williams for the prosecution. She testified that WIlliams confessed to her that he orchestrated the robbery and murder of Onfroy, and that he had attempted to have her write an affidavit lying that he was not the driver of the murder vehicle. Countering the defense's narrative, Carter stated that Williams never said anything about Drake or the rapper group Migos being involved in the murder, a conspiracy theory proposed by Williams's defense attorney.

John Curcio 
The lead detective in the murder investigation, John Curcio testified for the prosecution on February 23, 2023. He led the jury through the stages in the investigation. He stated, "The two different timelines mirrored each other. When the phone arrived, the car, the journey is seen, when the phone leaves Riva, the journey is leaving Riva." He denied conspiracy theories brought up by the defense regarding any involvement of Drake.

Nicole Ihnat 
Nicole Ihnat, a forensic DNA analyst from the Broward County crime laboratory testified for the prosecution on February 28, 2023. She stated that forensic DNA evidence, including DNA on the masks used during the murder, were consistent with the defendants'. Specifically, she stated that the DNA linked to Dedrick Williams was rarer than 1 in 831 octillion, and DNA linked to Michael Boatwright was rarer than 1 in 929 nonillion.

Witness intimidation allegations against Trayvon Newsome 
During the third day of the trial, Allen and a prison officer alleged witness intimidation against Trayvon Newsome. Allen and the prison officer stated that earlier that day while Allen and the other co-defendants were in their holding cells, Newsome yelled at Allen that he was a "police ass nigga", "work[s] for the police", that he is "working for the white man", and is "a sell out". The prosecution stated that this was a clear attempt to influence Allen's testimony.

Involvement of conspiracy theories regarding Drake

Initial subpoena for Drake deposition 
February 9, 2023, the third day of the trial, mainly featured Robert Allen confirming and corroborating information and details about the murder that the prosecution had present. Rapper Drake was also ordered to testify on February 27, and at the time it was said he may be charged with contempt of court if he did not appear.

Allegations of Drake's ties to Onfroy's murder come from conspiracy theories online stemming from their feud, with people online pointing out lyrics in various Drake songs that could be referencing Onfroy's death. Lyrics said to be alluding to or mocking Onfroy's death can be heard in "I'm Upset", which contains the lyrics "SMS, triple X, that's the only time I ever shoot below the neck" as well as "if he held his tongue on that live, he'd be alive again" from "On BS". Onfroy was shot in the neck or upper torso area, and also dissed Drake on Instagram, particularly through Instagram's live feature.

Cancellation of Drake deposition 
On February 13, 2023, Drake's lawyer appeared in court requesting for the cancellation of the requested deposition.

February 14, 2023, the sixth day of the trial, included testimony from Robert Allen regarding conspiracy theories brought up by defense attorneys that rapper Drake had ordered the murder of Jahseh Onfroy. Allen stated that Drake had not hired them to commit the murder, and that himself and the other three defendants were the only four involved in planning the murder. Following, trial judge Usan accepted Drake's lawyer's request, and Drake will no longer be requested to appear for deposition.

References 

2023 in Florida
2020s in Florida
2020s trials
21st-century American trials
February 2023 events in the United States
Murder trials
Legal history of Florida
XXXTentacion